The Bulloo state by-election, 1909 was a by-election held on 27 March 1909 for the Queensland Legislative Assembly seat of Bulloo, based in the remote south western part of the state.

The by-election was triggered by the death of Ministerial member John Leahy on 20 January 1909. Leahy had held the seat since 1893, five years after its creation. He was a minister in the First Philp Ministry from 1901 until 1903, and at the time of his death was the Legislative Assembly.

The seat included the towns of Thargomindah, Birdsville, Eromanga, Eulo, Hungerford and Windorah.

Timeline

Results
Frank Allen won the seat for the Labour Party.

References 

1909 elections in Australia
Queensland state by-elections
1900s in Queensland